The Egypt Hockey Federation ( or EHF) is the governing body of field hockey in Egypt. The Headquarters of EHF are in Nasr City, Cairo. It is affiliated to IHF International Hockey Federation and AHF African Hockey Federation.

See also
Egypt men's national field hockey team
Egypt women's national field hockey team

References

External links
 FIH-Egypt
 EHF-FB

Egypt
Hockey